Got My Own is an album by saxophonist Gene Ammons recorded in 1972 and released on the Prestige label.

Reception
Allmusic awarded the album 2½ stars with its review by Scott Yanow stating, "Ammons's huge sound makes the music worthwhile".

Track listing 
 "Lady Sings the Blues" (Billie Holiday, Herbie Nichols) - 5:30   
 "God Bless the Child" (Holiday, Arthur Herzog, Jr.) - 4:05   
 "Strange Fruit" (Abel Meeropol) - 3:30   
 "Fine and Mellow" (Holiday) - 5:30   
 "Play Me" (Neil Diamond) - 6:00   
 "Ben" (Don Black, Walter Scharf) - 5:30   
 "The Shack Out Back" (Gene Ammons) - 7:58   
Recorded at Van Gelder Studio in Englewood Cliffs, New Jersey on October 28, 1972 (tracks 1, 5 & 6), November 30, 1972 (tracks 3 & 4) and November 1, 1972 (tracks 2 & 7)

Personnel 
Gene Ammons - tenor saxophone
Ernie Hayes - organ (tracks 1, 4, 5 & 7)
Hank Jones - electric piano (tracks 1 & 3-6)
Sonny Phillips - piano, organ (tracks 2 & 7)
Joe Beck (tracks 1, 4, 5 & 6), Maynard Parker (tracks 2 & 7) - guitar
Ron Carter - bass, electric bass
Billy Cobham (tracks 2 & 7), Idris Muhammad (tracks 1, 5 & 6), Mickey Roker (tracks 3 & 4) - drums
Ed Bogas - arranger 
Unidentified strings

References 

Gene Ammons albums
1972 albums
Prestige Records albums
Albums produced by Ozzie Cadena
Albums recorded at Van Gelder Studio